The Ministry of Defence (MINISDEF) is the department of the Government of Spain responsible for planning, developing and carrying out the general guidelines of the Government about the defence policy and the managing of the military administration. It is the administrative and executive body of the Spanish Armed Forces.

According to the Constitution of 1978, the Monarch is the Commander in Chief of the Spanish military. He can declare war or conclude peace with authorization of the Cortes Generales, provided this act is countersigned by the Prime Minister.

The Ministry of Defense is headed by the Minister of Defence, a Cabinet member who depends directly from the Prime Minister. Beneath the Ministry of Defense are five subordinate principal departments: the Armed Forces headed by the Chief of the Defence Staff (JEMAD) which is divided in three military branches led by the Chief of Staff of the Army (JEME), the Chief of Staff of the Navy (AJEMA) and the Chief of Staff of the Air Force (JEMA); the Secretariat of State for Defence (headed by the Secretary of State, SEDEF); the Undersecretariat of Defence headed by the Ministry's Under-Secretary (SUBDEF) and the General Secretariat for Defence Policy head by the Secretary-General (SEGENPOL). In addition, the National Intelligence Center (CNI) is subordinated to the Ministry of Defence.

The current holder of the Ministry is Margarita Robles.

History

Primitive military administration 
Since the first origins of Spain, the monarchy has been the main form of government. That is the main reason why the first government departments appeared in the 18th century because for centuries, the monarch controlled all the power.

At the beginning, the King controlled the military through its Council of State which was divided in different sections dedicated to advise the King in the different areas of government.

Single and double secretariat 
On July 11, 1705, King Philip V created a Secretariat for war and treasury matters, called Secretariat of the Dispatch of War and Treasury mainly because of the War of Succession. Once the war was over, in 1714 the Administration was reformed and two secretariats appeared: one dedicated to the Army called Secretariat of the Dispatch of War and another to the Navy called the Secretariat of the Dispatch of the Navy and Indies.

The Secretariat of the Dispatch of the Navy and Indies was suppressed in 1715 and the competences over the Navy were transferred to the Secretariat of War. In 1721 the Secretariat of the Dispatch of the Navy was re-created assuming the competences on the naval forces but on 30 January 1776, the Secretariat of the Dispatch of the Indies was recovered assuming the control of the overseas's naval forces. Since then, the Secretariat of the Navy had competences only on the naval forces of the Peninsular Spain, the Canaries and the Balearics because the Secretariat of the Dispatch of the Indies assumed the responsibilities on the naval forces in the rest of the Empire. It wasn't until 1790 that this Secretariat also assumed the competences on the Overseas Navy when the Indies Secretariat was suppressed. The same did the Secretariat of War with the competencies on the land forces in the Indies.

Ministries 
This organization was maintained through decades and at the beginning of the 19th century, the terms Secretariat and Ministry were used as synonymous, until 1851 when the Ministry of War and Ministry of the Navy were officially renamed.

Since the Constitution of 1812, which creates the Secretary of State and of the Dispatch of the Overseas Government, until the creation of the Ministry of Overseas in 1863, there were constant hesitations in the allocation of powers over those domains and which advisory body to go in case of doubt in the resolution of the issues. In 1836 it is the Ministry of the Navy who assumes these functions; A few years later, they move to the Ministry of the Interior. In 1851 an Overseas Council and an Overseas Directorate were created under the Office of the Prime Minister.

The hesitations continue regarding the advisory body (the Overseas Council alternates with the Royal Council and the Advisory Board) the vacillations also occur in terms of the dependence of the Directorate that passes to the Ministry of State in 1854, it is added to the Development in 1856, to return to State a few months later and depends on the Ministry of War from 1858 until the creation of the Overseas Ministry by Royal Decree of 20 May 1863. It subsists until the loss of those imperial provinces and is definitively suppressed by Royal Decree of 15 April 1899.

First attempt and final unification 
At the beginning of the 20th century, the Air Force started to make its firsts steps and at the very start they were just the air branch of the Army and later it was also created a Naval Air Force subordinated to the Navy.

During the Civil War, the armed forces split into two sides: the republican and the nationalist. In the republican side, there were two main ministries: the Ministry of War and the Ministry of the Navy and Aire Force; in the national side, there were only one unified ministry, the Ministry of National Defence that had all the competences over the three branches. After the Civil War, the Francoist regime divided again the former Ministry of National Defence intro three ministries: Ministry of the Army, Ministry of the Navy and the new Ministry of the Air Force (created in 1939).

This three military departments disappeared in 1977 when they merged into the current Ministry of Defence. This new Ministry of Defence established its headquarters in a building belonged to the Ministry of Culture and the three headquarters of the military ministries were destined to hold the main headquarters of each military branch. The position of Under Secretary of Defence was created in 1977. The new military organization was established in 1984 with the JEMAD as the Chief Operative of the Armed Forces and the Prime Minister (through the Defence Minister) as de facto leader of the Armed Forces. The Monarch remained as the symbolic commander-in-chief and the position of Secretary of State for Defence was created too.

In 2020, the National Intelligence Center returned to the department's structure with Paz Esteban López as its first female director.

Structure 
The Department is organized as follows:

 The Armed Forces
 The Chief of the Defence Staff
 The Chief of Staff of the Army
 The Chief of Staff of the Navy
 The Chief of Staff of the Air Force
 The Secretariat of State for Defence
 The Directorate-General for Armament and Materiel
 The Directorate-General for Economic Affairs
 The Directorate-General for Infrastructure
The Center of Systems and Technologies of the Information and Communications
The General Secretariat for Defence Policy
The Directorate-General for Defence Policy
The Division for Security and Defense Studies and Coordination
 The Undersecretariat of Defence
 The Technical General Secretariat
 The Directorate-General for Personnel
 The Directorate-General for Military Recruitment and Teaching
The Deputy Directorate-General for the Internal Regime
The Deputy Directorate-General for Economic and Payroll Services
The Legal Department of the Defence
The Office of the Comptroller General of the Defence
The Inspectorate-General for Defence Health
 The Military Prison of Alcalá de Henares
 The Directorate for Institutional Communication of Defense

The Civil Guard depends on the Ministry of Defence in the terms stipulated by laws.

The Ministry of Defence's consultant and advisory bodies are:
 The Superior Council of the Army
 The Superior Council of the Navy
 The Superior Council of the Air Force
 The Superior Boards of the Common Corps of the Armed Forces

Agencies 

 The National Intelligence Centre
 The National Institute for Aerospace Technology
 The Institute for Housing, Infrastructure and Equipment of the Defense
 The Social Institute of the Armed Forces
 The Superior Council for Military Sport
 The Military Observatory for Equality between Women and Men in the Armed Forces
 The Military Archbishopric of Spain

Chain of Command

The Chain of Command of the military is regulated in the National Defence Organic Act of 2005.

Like the Constitution, the law recognizes the Monarch as the supreme commander of the Armed Forces. The Government is the body in charge of establishing the defense policy as well as control of the military administration. The Prime Minister is the civilian authority in command of the Armed Forces. The Minister of Defence, under the authority of the Prime Minister, control the Armed Forces and establish the military policy. The Chief of the Defence Staff (JEMAD) is the fourth military authority, in charge over the operative command of the Armed Forces. After the Chief of the Defence Staff are the Chief of Staff of the different branches.

The Parliament is the responsible for authorising the signing of military treaties, approving the defence laws and military budgets and authorize the Sovereign to declare war and to make peace. In particular, the Congress is responsible for authorising the use of the Armed Forces abroad in missions that are not of national interest, if they are of national interest, the Government can use them without authorization but communicating it to the Congress.

 The King
 The Prime Minister
 The Minister of Defence
 The Chief of the Defence Staff
 The Chief of Staff of the Army, the Chief of Staff of the Navy and the Chief of Staff of the Air Force
 Deputy Chief of Staff of the Army, the Deputy Chief of Staff of the Navy and the Deputy Chief of Staff of the Air Force

Headquarters 

The first military departments —War and Navy— were headquartered at the royal residence, first in the Royal Alcázar from 1714 to 1734, briefly in the Royal Palace of Buen Retiro since 1734 and in the Royal Palace when its construction was finished. In 1826, due to the lack of space in the Royal Palace, they relocated to the Palace of Marqués de Grimaldi. However, a fire in 1846 forced all government departments to be relocated and only the Ministry of the Navy stayed in that Palace. The Ministry of War installed in the Buenavista Palace in 1847, a building that previously housed some military facilities.

In 1915, given the poor state of the Grimaldi Palace, a new headquarters for the Ministry of the Navy was built. With the creation of the Ministry of the Air in 1939, the same thing happened and by the 1950s the new Ministry already occupied its own palace in Moncloa Square.

Already during the democratic transition, in 1977 the new Ministry of Defense was created, being headquartered in the Palacio de Buenavista until 1981. That year, all central services were moved out to a large building located at number 109 Paseo de la Castellana (belonging to the Ministry of Culture and that previously had been the headquarters of the Ministry of Information and Tourism) in which it still remains today. As for the other three palaces, they continued to belong to the department but became the general headquarters of the Army branches.

List of Ministers of Defence of Spain

References

Notes

See also

Related articles 
 Gobierno Militar de Pontevedra

External links
 Official website

Defence
Defence
Spain

Military units and formations established in 1977
Ministries established in 1977
1977 establishments in Spain
Government ministries of Spain
Spain